Jale Arıkan (born 22 August 1965) is a Turkish-German film and television actress. At the 35th Moscow International Film Festival in 2013, she won the Silver George for Best Actress for her role in the film Particle (2012) which won the Golden George.

Career
Arıkan was born in Turkey but later moved to Germany where she successfully pursued a career in acting. She showed a preference for thrillers and dramas. She has starred in several popular German-language television series, including Ein Fall für zwei (1987–1992), Rivalen der Rennbahn (1989), Hotel Paradies (1990), Tatort (1990–2012), Praxis Bülowbogen (1992), Wolffs Revier (1992), Der Fahnder (1994), Schwarz greift ein (1995), Abschnitt 40 (2003), Leipzig Homicide (2009), Stolberg (2009), Dahoam is Dahoam (2009–2010), Küstenwache (2011), and Der Lehrer (2015).

She starred as Polish Nadenka in the 2005 Luxembourgish film Your Name is Justine which was nominated at the 79th Academy Awards for the Academy Award for Best Foreign Language Film.

She was cast as Naomi in the English-language television film Samson and Delilah (1996).

Awards and nominations
At the 35th Moscow International Film Festival in 2013, she received the Silver George for Best Actress for her role in Particle. In 2014, she also won the award Best Actress in the Turkish Film Festival Frankfurt.

Filmography

Film

Television

References

External links
 
  

1965 births
German film actresses
German people of Turkish descent
German television actresses
Living people
Turkish emigrants to Germany
Turkish film actresses
Turkish television actresses